India is 5th globally for installed hydroelectric power capacity. As of 31 March 2020, India's installed utility-scale hydroelectric capacity was 46,000 MW, or 12.3% of its total utility power generation capacity. Additional smaller hydroelectric power units with a total capacity of 4,683 MW (1.3% of its total utility power generation capacity) have been installed. India's hydroelectric power potential is estimated at 148,700 MW at 60% load factor. In the fiscal year 2019–20, the total hydroelectric power generated in India was 156 TWh (excluding small hydro) with an average capacity factor of 38.71%.

The hydroelectric power plants at Darjeeling and Shivanasamudra were established in 1898 and 1902, respectively. They were among the first in Asia and India has been a dominant player in global hydroelectric power development. India also imports surplus hydroelectric power from Bhutan.

Small hydropower, defined to be generated at facilities with nameplate capacities up to 25 MW, comes under the ambit of the Ministry of New and Renewable energy (MNRE); whilst large hydro, defined as above 25 MW, comes under the ambit of the Ministry of Power.
Koyna Hydroelectric Project is the largest completed hydroelectric power plant in India, with a power capacity of 1960 MW

Hydroelectric potential

India's economically exploitable and viable hydroelectric potential is estimated to be 148,701 MW. An additional 6,780 MW from smaller hydro schemes (with capacities of less than 25 MW) is estimated as exploitable. 56 sites for pumped storage schemes with an aggregate installed capacity of 94,000 MW have also been identified. In central India, the hydroelectric power potential from the Godavari, Mahanadi, Nagavali, Vamsadhara and Narmada river basins has not been developed on a major scale due to potential opposition from the tribal population.

Basin-wise potential of Hydropower
Brahmaputra has highest potential in terms of generating Hydroelectricity followed by Indus, Ganga. East following rivers have largest potential as compared to west following rivers and central Indian basins 

The public sector accounts for 92.5% of India's hydroelectric power production. The National Hydroelectric Power Corporation (NHPC), Northeast Electric Power Company (NEEPCO), Satluj Jal Vidyut Nigam (SJVNL), THDC, and NTPC-Hydro are some of the public sector companies producing hydroelectric power in India. The private sector is also expected to grow with the development of hydroelectric energy in the Himalayan mountain ranges and in the northeast of India. 
Indian companies have also constructed hydropower projects in Bhutan, Nepal, Afghanistan, and other countries.

Bhakra Beas Management Board (BBMB), a state-owned enterprise in north India, has an installed capacity of 2.9 GW. BBMB is a major source of peaking power and black start capability to the northern grid in India and its large reservoirs provide wide operational flexibility.

The International Hydropower Association estimates that the total hydropower potential in India is 660,000 GWh/year, of which 540,000 GWh/year (79%) is still undeveloped. India ranks as the fourth country in the world by undeveloped hydropower potential, after Russia, China and Canada, and fifth by total potential, surpassed also by Brazil.

Pumped storage units

India has transformed from an electricity deficit state to an electricity surplus state. Peak load shortages can be met making use of pumped storage schemes which store surplus power to meet peak load demands. The pumped storage schemes also contribute secondary, seasonal power at no additional cost when rivers are flooded with excess water. India has already established nearly 4,800 MW pumped storage capacity with the installation of hydropower plants.

Pumped storage units can also be used as pumping stations to supply river water for upland irrigation, industrial needs, and drinking water. In a tropical country like India, abundant water for agriculture is needed due to a very high annual evaporation rate. The amount of water necessary to meet this demand can be harnessed from India's rivers via pumped storage units. Food security in India is improved with water security which in turn is possible from the energy security to supply the power needed for the pumped storage schemes.

More and more solar power generation is becoming available at cheaper cost and it has advantage in terms of environmental impact. Solar power can meet daytime and night time energy demands with the help of pumped storage units. 

Many of the existing hydro power stations on the west-flowing rivers located in the Western Ghats of Kerala and Karnataka are to be expanded to include pumped storage units in an effort to solve the water deficit of east-flowing rivers like the Kaveri, the Krishna, etc.

See also 

 List of hydro power stations in India
 Electricity sector in India
 Energy policy of India
 Pollution of the Ganges
 Water resources in India
 Indian Rivers Inter-link
 Wind power in India
 Solar power in India
 Biofuel in India
 Power sector of Andhra Pradesh
 Renewable energy in India
 Yarlung Tsangpo Hydroelectric Project

References 

Hydroelectricity in India
India